James William Hill (born January 8, 1953) is a political theorist and filmmaker. His most notable film work is an independent feature entitled The Streetsweeper, about a former opera singer who gave up a promising career on the stage to support his family. Many of Hill's radical and often controversial views are intertwined within the film.

External links
The Streetsweeper official website

1953 births
Living people
American film directors